Puttur is a town in Tirupati district of the Indian state of Andhra Pradesh. It is the mandal headquarters of Puttur mandal in Tirupati revenue division. It is known for a traditional method of splinting/bandaging bone fractures.

Geography 

It has an average elevation of 144 metres (472 feet). It is located 100 km from Chennai and 40 km from Tirupati city. It falls on the Mumbai- Chennai railway route. As it's located in Andhra Pradesh & Tamil Nadu border people speak Telugu and Tamil in this region.

Education
Puttur serves near by 6 major mandals. Puttur consists of 10 ZPHS government Schools, 12 MPPS schools, many private schools and many junior and degree colleges along with 3 major Engineering colleges under the School Education Department of the state.

See also 
List of municipalities in Andhra Pradesh

References

External links
 

Towns in Tirupati district
Mandal headquarters in Tirupati district